Vishal Singh may refer to:

 Vishal Singh (actor, born 1974), Indian actor known for Dekh Bhai Dekh
 Vishal Singh (actor, born 1985), Indian actor known for Kuchh Is Tara
 Vishal Singh (cricketer) (born 1993), Indian cricketer
 Vishal Singh (polo player), Indian polo player
 Vishal Aditya Singh (born 1989), Indian actor known for Begusarai
 Vishal Singh Yadav (born 1967), Indian cricketer

See also
 Vishal (name)
 List of people with surname Singh
 Vishal Sangh, a cane farmers union established 1946 in Fiji